The 2006 Ukrainian Amateur Cup  was the eleventh annual season of Ukraine's football knockout competition for amateur football teams. The competition started on 22 July 2006 and concluded on 8 October 2006.

Competition schedule
This year ODEK Orzhiv started from the quarterfinals. All the other teams started from the 1/8 finals.

First round (1/8)

Quarterfinals (1/4)

Semifinals (1/2)

Final

See also
 2006 Ukrainian Football Amateur League
 2006–07 Ukrainian Cup

External links
 2006 Ukrainian Amateur Cup at the Footpass (Football Federation of Ukraine)

2006
Amateur Cup
2006 domestic association football cups